André Théry (1864–1947) was a French entomologist who specialised in Coleoptera  especially Buprestidae. 
He founded in Algiers la Société d'Histoire naturelle de l'Afrique du Nord ( 1909) and in  Morocco la Société des Sciences Naturelles (1920).

Works
partial list
Théry, A. 1926  Recherches synonymiques sur les Buprestides et descriptions d'espèces nouvelles. Bulletin et Annales de la Société Entomologique de Belgique 66: 149–182. 
Théry, A. 1930 Recherches synonymiques sur les Buprestides et notes diverses. I. Note sur le genre Galbella avec descriptiones d'espéces nouvelles; II. Observations concernant la preface du travail de M. Gebhardt; III. A propos de "Opuscula Buprestologica". Bulletin de la Société des Sciences Naturelles du Maroc 10: 21–53. 
Théry, A.  1934 Contributions a l'étude de la faune de Mozambique. Voyage de M. P. Lesne (1928–1929). 15e note, Coléoptères, Buprestides. Memórias e Estudos do Museu Zoológico de Universidade de Coimbra (1) No 77: 1–31.  
Faune de France   Volume n° 41 - Coléoptères Buprestides. 1942, 221 p., 149 fig. (réimpression 1999) 
Théry, A.  1944 Monographie des Tetragonoschema (Coleop. Buprestidae, Anthaxini). Novitates Entomologicae 14 (4e suppl.): 1–25.

References

French entomologists
Presidents of the Société entomologique de France
1947 deaths
1864 births